General Artigas railway station is the former main railway station in Montevideo, Uruguay. Located in barrio Aguada, it was designed by the Italian engineer and architect Luigi Andreoni, it was opened to the public on 15 July 1897 and was closed on 1 March 2003, being replaced by a halt  to the north.

Gallery

External links

Passenger Group defending Montevideo Central Station. El País, March 2005

Buildings and structures in Montevideo
Neoclassical architecture in Uruguay
Railway stations in Uruguay
Aguada, Montevideo
José Gervasio Artigas